Museums Journal is an online resource and monthly print magazine published by the Museums Association. Museums Journal is a leading source of news and information for museums, galleries, heritage sites and historic houses. Simon Stephens is the current editor, with Eleanor Mills the deputy editor.  

Museums Journal is free for all individual members of the Museums Association. Non-members can subscribe.

Museums Journal publishes news stories daily, Q&As with museum sector leaders, alongside monthly features, comment, news analysis, reviews, and a section dedicated to museum people.

New museums and exhibitions are peer-reviewed in Museums Journal, and website users can log in to add their own comments. Both UK and international openings are covered by the magazine. A weekly blog is written by the editorial staff.

Practical work and case studies are covered in Museums Journal'''s sister publication, Museum Practice.Museums Journal'' is editorially independent of the Museums Association. It represents the Museums Association's policy priorities and work programmes as well as other views. The editor has final say about what is published.

History
It was first published in 1901. Elijah Howarth was the first editor, and remained editor until 1909, when he resigned.

Peter van Mensch described the publication as "the first national journal for the museum field as a whole".

References

External links
 Museums Journal Online
 Museums Journal Volumes 1-23 (July 1901-June 1924) at HathiTrust Digital Library
 Museums Journal Volume 1 (1901) at archive.org 
 Museums Journal Volume 2 (1902) at archive.org 
 Museums Journal Volume 3 (1903) at archive.org 
 Museums Journal Volume 4 (1904) at archive.org
 Museums Journal Volume 6 (1906) at archive.org 
 Museums Journal Volume 7 (1907) at archive.org

1901 establishments in England
Monthly magazines published in the United Kingdom
News magazines published in the United Kingdom
Online magazines published in the United Kingdom
Magazines established in 1901
Professional and trade magazines